María Fernanda Valdés Paris (born 17 March 1992) is a Chilean weightlifter. She won the silver medal at the 2011 Pan American Games in the 75 kg event and also at the 2015 Pan American Games in the 75 kg event.

She competed at the 2012 Summer Olympics in the 75 kg event finishing ninth. She competed in the 2016 Summer Olympics.

Career 

In the Pan American Weightlifting Championships 2016, held in Colombia, she took first place. In that competition she lifted a total of 244 kilos, tying with the Colombian Valoyes, but the lower weight of the Chilean won her the gold medal. 
Days later, Chilean Weightlifting Federation confirmed her for the Olympic Games in Rio de Janeiro 2016.

At the Olympics in Rio de Janeiro, Valdes finished seventh in the final of the under 75 kilos category, lifting 107 kilos in the snatch, and 135 in the clean and jerk, totaling 242 kilos.

She qualified to represent Chile at the 2020 Summer Olympics, but had to retire less than two weeks before the start of the event due to a shoulder dislocation.

Major results

References

External links
 

1992 births
Living people
Chilean female weightlifters
Olympic weightlifters of Chile
Weightlifters at the 2012 Summer Olympics
Weightlifters at the 2016 Summer Olympics
Weightlifters at the 2011 Pan American Games
Weightlifters at the 2015 Pan American Games
Pan American Games medalists in weightlifting
Pan American Games silver medalists for Chile
World Weightlifting Championships medalists
People from Coquimbo
South American Games gold medalists for Chile
South American Games medalists in weightlifting
Competitors at the 2018 South American Games
Weightlifters at the 2019 Pan American Games
Medalists at the 2011 Pan American Games
Medalists at the 2019 Pan American Games
Medalists at the 2015 Pan American Games
20th-century Chilean women
21st-century Chilean women